The Paul and Fredriika Geranen Farm is a historic farm located east of Frederick, South Dakota. The farm's seventeen buildings include two houses, a barn, and a Finnish sauna. The farm was settled by Paul and Fredriika Geranen, a Finnish immigrant couple who moved to the land in 1893. In addition to farming, Paul ran a store in Savo. After the couple moved to Bryant, their son Fred rented the farm; Fred rebuilt the farm's sauna and added the second house.

The farm was added to the National Register of Historic Places in 1985.

References

Farms on the National Register of Historic Places in South Dakota
Buildings and structures in Brown County, South Dakota
Finnish-American culture in South Dakota
National Register of Historic Places in Brown County, South Dakota